Holštejn is a municipality and village in Blansko District in the South Moravian Region of the Czech Republic. It has about 200 inhabitants.

Notable people
Josef Korčák (1921–2008), politician

References

Villages in Blansko District